Lila Rajiva  is an American writer. She has undergraduate degrees in economics and English as well as a master's degree from Johns Hopkins University, where she did doctoral work in international relations and political philosophy. She has taught at the University of Maryland, Baltimore County.

In 2005, Rajiva authored The Language of Empire: Abu Ghraib and the American Media, a study of propaganda which examines the place of Iraqi prisoner torture in U.S. culture and politics. Rajiva co-authored Mobs, Messiahs, and Markets with Bill Bonner, which details mass delusions in the markets and politics and explains why they continually arise. The book was awarded the GetAbstract International Book Award for 2008.

References

External links 
  
 Schema-root.org archive

American women journalists
American libertarians
Johns Hopkins University alumni
Writers from Baltimore
Year of birth missing (living people)
Living people
21st-century American women